Spahia is an Albanian surname. It is derived from the Turkish term sipahi (from Persian: سپاهی (sepāhī) with the meaning "soldier") for a cavalryman. People with the surname include:
 Ali Spahia (1935–2000), Albanian surgeon and politician
 Eqerem Spahia (born 1960), Albanian politician
 Halim Spahia (1897–1946), Albanian merchant and industrialist
 Sadik Spahia (born 1959), Albanian sculptor

References

Albanian-language surnames
Patronymic surnames